Guanidinonaltrindole may refer to:

 5'-Guanidinonaltrindole
 6'-Guanidinonaltrindole